The  1939 German football championship, the 32nd edition of the competition, was won by Schalke 04, the club's fourth German championship, by defeating Admira Wien 9–0 in the final, with Ernst Kalwitzki scoring five goals. For Admira it was the club's only appearance in the German championship while the 9–0 result was the highest winning margin for any of the finals held between 1903 and 1963, surpassing VfB Leipzig's 7–2 victory over DFC Prag in the inaugural 1903 final. For Schalke, it continued the club's most successful era, having won the 1934, 1935 and 1937 final and going on to win the 1940 and 1942 ones as well.

Schalke's Ernst Kalwitzki was the 1939 championships top scorer with eleven goals, having previously finished as the top scorer in 1937.

The eighteen 1938–39 Gauliga champions, two more than in 1938 because of the addition of the Gauliga Ostmark after the Anschluss and the Gauliga Sudetenland after the Munich Agreement, competed in a group stage with the four group winners advancing to the semi-finals. The two semi-final winners then contested the 1939 championship final. The groups were divided into three with four clubs and one with six clubs with the latter, in turn, subdivided into two groups of three teams each and a final of these group winners to determine the over all group champions.

While, in the following season, the German championship was still played with eighteen clubs as well but it gradually expanded through a combination of territorial expansion of Nazi Germany and the sub-dividing of the Gauligas in later years, reaching a strength of thirty one in its last completed season, 1943–44.

Qualified teams
The teams qualified through the 1938–39 Gauliga season:

Competition

Group 1
Group 1 was contested by the champions of the Gauligas Brandenburg, Niedersachsen, Nordmark and Ostpreußen:

Group 2

Group 2A
Group 2A was contested by the champions of the Gauligas Mittelrhein, Niederrhein and Pommern:

Group 2B
Group 2B was contested by the champions of the Gauligas Bayern, Sachsen and Sudetenland:

Group 2 final

|}

Group 3
Group 3 was contested by the champions of the Gauligas Baden, Mitte, Ostmark and Württemberg:

Group 4
Group 4 was contested by the champions of the Gauligas Hessen, Schlesien, Südwest and Westfalen:

Semi-finals
Two of the four clubs in the 1939 semi-finals had reached the same stage in the previous season, Hamburger SV and FC Schalke 04, while Admira Wien and Dresdner SC replaced Fortuna Düsseldorf and previous seasons champions Hannover 96 in comparison to 1938:

|align="center" style="background:#ddffdd" colspan=3|4 June 1939

|}

Replay

|align="center" style="background:#ddffdd" colspan=3|11 June 1939

|}

Third place play-off

|align="center" style="background:#ddffdd" colspan=3|17 June 1939

|}

Final

|align="center" style="background:#ddffdd" colspan=3|18 June 1939

|}

References

Sources
 kicker Allmanach 1990, by kicker, page 164 & 177 - German championship

External links
 German Championship 1938–39 at weltfussball.de 
 German Championship 1939 at RSSSF

1
German
German football championship seasons